Elisabeth Sophie of Brandenburg (5 April 1674 – 22 November 1748), was a Duchess consort of Courland by marriage to Duke Frederick Casimir Kettler of Courland, a Margravine consort of Brandenburg-Bayreuth by marriage to Christian Ernst, Margrave of Brandenburg-Bayreuth, and a Duchess consort of Saxe-Meiningen by marriage to Ernst Ludwig I, Duke of Saxe-Meiningen. She was joint regent in Courland during the minority of her son Frederick William, Duke of Courland from 1698 until 1701.

Biography 

Elisabeth Sophie was born to Frederick William I, Elector of Brandenburg and Sophia Dorothea of Schleswig-Holstein-Sonderburg-Glücksburg.

Courland
She married (29 April 1691) her cousin, Duke Frederick Casimir Kettler of Courland (1650–1698). The marriage was arranged as an alliance between the two families; in 1703 her brother Albert Frederick was to marry her first husband's daughter, Mary Dorothea.

When her husband died in 1698, Elisabeth Sophie became joint guardian-regent along with her former brother-in-law Ferdinand. In January 1701, Elisabeth Sophie left Courland, her son and stepdaughter for her brother's court in Berlin. In 1703, she was formally deprived of the custody of her son and the regency. She was later given a Russian allowance from Anna of Russia.

Brandenburg-Bayreuth
She married Christian Ernst, Margrave of Brandenburg-Bayreuth (6 August 1644 – 20 May 1712) on 30 March 1703 in Potsdam. She is said to have dominated him completely and directed his policy in a pro-Prussian direction. He gave her the palace Markgräfliches Schloss Erlangen, which was named after her. She was described as proud and a great lover of pomp and ceremony. Her expenses had a bad effect on the finances of the state.

Saxe-Meiningen
She married on 3 June 1714 on Schloss Ehrenburg to Ernst Ludwig I, Duke of Saxe-Meiningen (1672–1724).

Issue 
 Frederick William Kettler, Duke of Courland (19 July 1692 – 21 January 1711).
 Leopold Charles Kettler (14 December 1693 – 21 July 1697).

Ancestry

See also
 Bibliography of Russian history (1613–1917)

References

1674 births
1748 deaths
17th-century Latvian people
17th-century women rulers
Duchesses of Courland
Margravines of Brandenburg-Bayreuth
Duchesses of Saxe-Meiningen
18th-century women rulers
Daughters of monarchs
Remarried royal consorts